The white-vented shama (Copsychus niger) is a species of bird in the chat and flycatcher family Muscicapidae. It is endemic to the Palawan, Balabac and Calamian in the Philippines. The species is sometimes placed in the genus Kittacincla, and is the sister species to the black shama of Cebu.

Little is known about the species, which lives in primary on degraded rainforest and scrub.

References

white-vented shama
Birds of Palawan
Endemic birds of the Philippines
white-vented shama
Taxonomy articles created by Polbot
Taxobox binomials not recognized by IUCN